KWYW (99.1 FM) is a radio station broadcasting an adult contemporary format. Licensed to Lost Cabin, Wyoming, United States, the station is currently owned by Jerry and Steve Edwards, through licensee Edwards Communications, LC, and features programming from AP Radio.

History
The station was assigned the call sign KSXZ on November 11, 1999.  On July 5, 2001, the station changed its call sign to the current KWYW.

On July 7, 2017, KWYW changed their format from sports to adult contemporary, branded as "99.1 The Heat". (info taken from stationintel.com)

Facilities
The station shares its antenna with KDNO on Copper Mountain.

Previous logo

References

External links

Mainstream adult contemporary radio stations in the United States
WYW
Fremont County, Wyoming
1999 establishments in Wyoming
Radio stations established in 1999